HNoMS Vale (N53) was a Royal Norwegian Navy minelayer. She was built by Mjellem & Karlsen in Bergen in 1978, and named after Odin's son Vale from Norse mythology. Vale was given to the Latvian Navy in 2003. She was renamed Virsaitis, that in translation from Latvian means "Chieftain".

Her sister ship  was sold to Lithuania in 2006.

References

External links
Royal Norwegian Navy web page about Vidar

Vidar-class minesweepers
Ships built in Bergen
1977 ships
Minesweepers of the Latvian Naval Forces
Minesweepers of Latvia